Heli, also heli, heli- may refer to:

People
Heli, King of Britain (mythical)
Heli (Bible), listed as an ancestor of Jesus
Heli (name)

Places
 Heli, Tangyuan County (鹤立镇), town in Tangyuan County, Heilongjiang, China
 Heli, Funing County, Jiangsu (合利镇), town in Funing County, Jiangsu, China
 an old name for the town of Ely, England
 a parish in the municipality Spydeberg, Norway.
 "-hely" is Hungarian for "village" and is part of some Hungarian placenames

Companies
 Heli Malongo Airways, an airline from Angola

Other uses 
 Heli (film), a 2013 Mexican film
 slang for helicopter
 also may mean a weapon used by Kronos (or Cronus) the titan

A prefix of a word

heli- indicating a reference to helicopters; examples may or may not be hyphenated according to local or popular usage:
helipad, also heli-pad 
heli-ski, also heliski
helibus
helicase
helidrome
heliman
helipilot
heliport
heliscoop
helistop
helitaxi